António Dias Graça Nunes (born 26 January 1964), commonly known as Dias Graça, is a former Brazilian professional footballer.

Career

Graça started his career with Varzim.

Career statistics

Club

Notes

References

1964 births
Living people
Footballers from Rio de Janeiro (city)
Brazilian footballers
Association football goalkeepers
Primeira Liga players
Segunda Divisão players
Varzim S.C. players
A.D. Lousada players
Gil Vicente F.C. players
S.L. Benfica footballers
Brazilian expatriate footballers
Brazilian expatriate sportspeople in Portugal
Expatriate footballers in Portugal